The U.S. Post Office and Courthouse in Devils Lake, North Dakota, was built in 1908.  It was designed by James Knox Taylor and includes Classical Revival architecture.  Also known as Devils Lake Post Office and as the Federal Building, it served historically as a courthouse and as a post office.  The building was listed on the National Register of Historic Places in 1978.

According to its NRHP nomination, its Greek Revival styling is rare in North Dakota, and especially in Devils Lake, a "small rurally oriented community".  In addition, the "quality of materials and workmanship set a nearly unattainable standard among contemporary buildings and, therefore, the 'Federal Building' became a cultural and artistic landmark to the community, a source of prestige still felt and honored."

The Lake Region Heritage Center in the Old Post Office Building hosts many local and travelling exhibits. Exhibits include local history displays, a post office, recreations of a local doctor's and dentist office, the original federal courtroom, an early law office, a barber shop,  and a display of Native American artifacts. The Center also hosts art exhibits in cooperation with the North Dakota Art Gallery Association.

References

External links
 Lake Region Heritage Center

Courthouses on the National Register of Historic Places in North Dakota
Post office buildings on the National Register of Historic Places in North Dakota
Neoclassical architecture in North Dakota
Government buildings completed in 1908
Former federal courthouses in the United States
Museums in Ramsey County, North Dakota
National Register of Historic Places in Ramsey County, North Dakota
1908 establishments in North Dakota
Individually listed contributing properties to historic districts on the National Register in North Dakota